Carmen Selves (born Maria Carmen Selvas Baltierrez on January 4, 1931 in Manresa) is a  contemporary Catalan painter.

Biography 
Carmen Selves was born in Manresa.

Specialized in portrait and oil painting, being pianist, she enter the Reial Acadèmia Catalana de Belles Arts de Sant Jordi in Barcelona 1952, where she obtains her diplom in 1955. Her first oil paintings was done when she was 9 years old, no doubt she was influenced by her mother who possessed artistic gifts. Daughter of Joan Selvas i Carner and Carmen Baltierrez i Clotet, she lived the post-war period at the start of her career, being completely outside any political orientation but suffering from the consequences of the situation. When she was only 14 years old, she painted a rural landscape of Castelltallat range; she received a special mention in a painting competition of the parish of Sant Josep de Manresa and was recognized as a talented painter by the critic Ferran Hurtado Sanchis. This pushes her to study painting not only in Manresa, being an active painter of the Artistic Circle of Manresa, but also in Barcelona.

At the School of Sant Jordi, she had as teachers renowned painters such as Francisco Ribera Gómez, Josep Puigdengolas Barella or Ernest Santasusagna i Santacreu. But the greatest influence, leaving aside the classics which she knows very well, she received from her tutor after the completion of her studies, that of Evarist Basiana i Arbiell and his unique theory of the color that is applied in some of Carmen Selves paintings. In 1952 he made a donation to the Manresa County Museum. In 1979, she obtained a diploma in archeology at the University of Barcelona. She also worked at Museu Nacional d'Art de Catalunya. Later, in 1992, for her personal interest and also to meet the academic requirements of the baccalaureate, she wrote a university thesis on the painter Lluïsa Vidal.

Dissemination of the works 

Despite the fact that the most part of his works are not for sale because they are very personal family themes, Carmen Selves have been taking care of spreading her works. By reading his resume you can see the books, magazines and exhibitions in which she has appeared. They are very few for an artist who has worked for many years, but they are a significant number of them. With the advent of the internet, her works have been disseminated through her personal website, and she have been working together to increas her popularity with internet art sellers and/or promoters such as Circle arts, Artquest, Arteinformado, Artelista, DeviantArt, Agora Gallery, Cuadros de una exposición and others. The result of this continuous marketing effort is having a bit (not much) of popularity. Carmen Selves is a painter who could be classified chronologically as belonging to the Spanish school of the mid-20th century, but well into the 21st century, she is still an active and innovative painter.

Private life 

Married to Josep Maria Vicente Esforzado, she had 4 children and many obligations which made her presence in the world of exhibitions, between 1957 and 1994 approximately, more rare.

Evolution of works style 
First a portrait painter, in her first stage, she has a style halfway between expressionism figurative and impressionism. Then her portrait and her vision are more symbolists and she always uses other techniques besides oil painting: murals, ceramics, acrylics and others. She participates graphically and in other forms (scripts, voice, directing, production, etc.) in the creation of computerized animations in an unusual style and even does a video game  whenever the themes provide a message. clearly positive. She also practices the themes of landscapes, marine and rural or simply floral and animal, uses urban themes and still life. She illustrates interactive children's books of which she herself publishes limited editions.

Exhibitions 
As it can be readen in her CV, the works of Carmen Selves have been shown, so far, in 18 solo exhibitions and 26 group exhibitions. Carmen Selves has exhibited in Finland, Spain, France, Italy, Japan, and the United States among others.
 2014 : New York Agora Gallery
 2015 : Museum Gustavo de Maeztu of Estella
 2011 : Galeria ESART
 2017 : Galeria ESART
 2021 : Artexpo New York 2021

References 

Painters from Catalonia
Spanish contemporary artists
People from Manresa
Living people
1931 births
Spanish women painters
20th-century Spanish women artists
21st-century Spanish women artists